The Narrowing Circle is a 1956 British crime film directed by Charles Saunders and starring Paul Carpenter, Hazel Court and Russell Napier. It is based on the 1954 novel of the same title by Julian Symons. The film's sets were designed by the art director Wilfred Arnold.

Synopsis
The screenplay concerns a crime writer who finds himself accused of murder, and has to clear his name.

Cast
 Paul Carpenter as Dave Nelson
 Hazel Court as Rosemary Speed
 Russell Napier as Sir Henry Dimmock
 Trevor Reid as Inspector 'Dumb' Crambo
 Paula Byrne as Laura Martin
 June Ashley as Christy
 Ferdy Mayne as  Bill Strayte
 Basil Dignam as George Pacey
 Ronnie Stevens as Jimmy
 James Booth in a minor role
 Hugh Latimer as Charles Pears

References

Bibliography
 Goble, Alan. The Complete Index to Literary Sources in Film. Walter de Gruyter, 1999.
 Spicer, Andrew. Historical Dictionary of Film Noir. Scarecrow Press, 2010.

External links

1956 films
1956 crime films
British crime films
Films directed by Charles Saunders
Films based on British novels
Films set in London
1950s English-language films
1950s British films
British black-and-white films